Maria, Registered in Bilbao (Spanish: María, matrícula de Bilbao) is a 1960 Spanish drama film directed by Ladislao Vajda and starring Alberto Closas, Arturo Fernández and Nadia Gray.

Cast

References

Bibliography 
 Bentley, Bernard. A Companion to Spanish Cinema. Boydell & Brewer, 2008.

External links 
 

1960 drama films
Spanish drama films
1960 films
1960s Spanish-language films
Films directed by Ladislao Vajda
1960s Spanish films